The 1970 Auburn Tigers football team represented Auburn University in the 1970 NCAA University Division football season.  Under the leadership of head coach Ralph Jordan, Tigers completed the regular season with a record of 8–2. Auburn won the Gator Bowl against Ole Miss by a score of 35–28. They completed the season with a record of 9–2 and were ranked #10 in the AP Poll and #9 in the Coaches Poll.

The Tigers broke the Southeastern Conference (SEC) record for total yards for the regular season up to that point with 4,850, exceeding the previous record of 4,725 yards set by the 1942 Georgia Bulldogs. They had 1,965 yards rushing and 2,885 yards passing."

Schedule

Game summaries

Tennessee
The first big test of the season came against Tennessee in Birmingham, Alabama. Tennessee came in ranked #17 in the country and Auburn was not ranked. Auburn overcame a 10–0 deficit to win 36–23. It was the only loss for Tennessee and cost them the SEC championship.

Florida
In a rivalry known for frequent close games, this one wasn't. It was the worst defeat for either side since 1917, when Auburn won 68–0.  Pat Sullivan completed 21 of 27 passes for 366 yards and four touchdowns with three of them caught by Terry Beasley in the 63–14 drubbing.  It was also Florida's homecoming game.  It marked Auburn's fourth victory in a row against the Gators.

Tiger Bowl (LSU)
Auburn's first loss of the season came against LSU. LSU did not lose to any SEC team that year and won the SEC championship. They did not have to play Tennessee.

Iron Bowl (Alabama)
Alabama scored first on an 80-yard touchdown drive 3:17 into the game; then drove 70 yards to add another. After a pair of turnovers, another drive of 71 yards stalled at the 9 and they added a field goal to take the lead 17–0. Auburn finally scored midway through the second half with a touchdown and added a field goal to make it 17–10 at the half. They would then tie the game at 17 midway through the third. Alabama added a field goal at the beginning of the 4th quarter and Auburn answered tying the game again. Auburn then took the lead 27–20 and the Tide answered with a two-point conversion to take the lead by one. With 3:56 left to go in the game, Wallace Clark dove in for a touchdown from the three giving Auburn the lead by 6.  Pat Sullivan threw the two-pointer to Terry Beasley, but the play was nullified by illegal motion and the subsequent attempt was intercepted. Alabama was unable to score again and Auburn won 33–28.

Johnny Musso had over 200 yards rushing for the Tide and Pat Sullivan was 22 of 38 passing with 317 yards for Auburn.

Gator Bowl
In an unusual matchup between two teams from the same conference, Auburn met Ole Miss in the Gator Bowl.  (The two teams did not meet during the regular season.)  It was a matchup between two top quarterbacks, Pat Sullivan for Auburn and Archie Manning for the University of Mississippi. Archie Manning was recovering from a broken arm suffered on November 7, yet played against LSU a month later with his arm.  Auburn won 35–28. Coach Jordan was unable to attend the game.

Roster

Awards and honors
 SEC Most Valuable Player: Pat Sullivan (QB)
 SEC Back of the Year–Birmingham QB Club: Pat Sullivan (QB)
 SEC Back of the Year–Atlanta TD Club: Pat Sullivan (QB)
 All-Americans: Pat Sullivan (QB), Terry Beasley (SE), Larry Willingham(DB)
 All-SEC first team: Pat Sullivan (QB), Terry Beasley (SE), Gardner Jett (SP), Larry Willingham (DB), Bobby Strickland (LB)

References

Auburn
Auburn Tigers football seasons
Gator Bowl champion seasons
Auburn Tigers football